The 1973 Rally of Morocco (formally the 16th Rally of Morocco) was the fifth round of the inaugural World Rally Championship season.  Run in mid-May between Morocco's two major cities, Rabat and Casablanca, the Rallye du Maroc was a very long stage rally covering more than 1200 km on both hard and soft surface roads.

Report 
In 1973, and for several years afterward, only manufacturers were given points for finishes in WRC events.  Morocco represented a third win for the strong Alpine Renault A110 1800, though the Citroën DS 23 also made a strong showing.

Results 

Source: Independent WRC archive

Championship standings after the event

References

External links 
 Official website of the World Rally Championship
 1973 Rally Morocco at Rallye-info 

Morocco
Rally of Morocco
1973 in Moroccan sport